Ramila minima is a moth in the family Crambidae. It was described by Fu-Qiang Chen and Chun-Sheng Wu in 2014. It is found in China (Shandong) and Vietnam.

The wingspan is 15–16 mm. The forewings are silvery white with a fuscous costa, a fuscous spot at the basal trisection and fuscous spots at the upper and lower angles of the cell. There is a fuscous antemedial line from the lower angle of the cell to the middle of the inner margin. The postmedial and marginal lines are also fuscous. The hindwings are white with fuscous antemedial, postmedial and marginal lines.

Etymology
The species name refers to the small size of the species and is derived from Latin mini (meaning small).

References

Moths described in 2014
Schoenobiinae